A duet is a musical form for two performers.

Duet may also refer to:

Places
 Duet, Virginia

Art, entertainment, and media

Films 
 Duet (1994 film), a 1994 Indian Tamil musical film directed by K. Balachander
 Duet (2006 film), a 2006 short film written, produced and directed by Kiarash Anvari
 Duet (2014 film), a 2014 short film created by Disney animator Glen Keane

Games
 Duet (video game), a 2013 action game by Kumobius

Music

Compositions
  Classical 
 Duet, Steve Reich
 Duet in B, Christoph Schaffrath
 Organ Duet, Samuel Wesley

  Jazz 
 "Duet" (Neal Hefti composition), 1957 jazz composition and arrangement by Neal Hefti

 Pop 
 "Duet" (Everything Everything song), 2013
 "Duett" (Rolf Løvland song), English version of Norwegian song Duett performed by Bettan & Jan Werner in 1994

Albums
 Duet!, a 1972 album by Earl Hines and Jaki Byard
 Duet (Stan Kenton and June Christy album), 1955
 Duet (Doris Day and André Previn album), 1962
 Duet (Lester Bowie and Phillip Wilson album), 1978 
 Duet (Gary Burton & Chick Corea album), 1979
 Duet (Muhal Richard Abrams album), 1981
 Duet (Lester Bowie and Nobuyoshi Ino album), 1985 
 Duet (Stretch), 2008 - live at Blue Note Tokyo in 2007 
 Duet (Ronan Keating album), 2010
 Duet (Archie Shepp and Dollar Brand album)

Music business 
 Duet, the original name for online music service PressPlay

Television 
 "Duet" (Star Trek: Deep Space Nine), a 1993 episode of Star Trek: Deep Space Nine
 "Duet" (Stargate Atlantis), an episode of the science fiction television series Stargate Atlantis
 Duet (TV series), a Fox sitcom
 "Duet" (The Flash), a musical crossover episode of The Flash with Supergirl

Education 
 DUET, Dawood University of Engineering and Technology, Karachi, Pakistan
 DUET, Dhaka University of Engineering & Technology, Gazipur, Bangladesh

See also
 Duets (disambiguation)
 Duo (disambiguation)